The Love County Courthouse, located at 100 S. 4th St. in Marietta, Oklahoma, was built in 1907–10 to serve Love County.  It was listed on the National Register of Historic Places in 1984.

It is three stories tall, or two stories plus a raised basement.

References

Courthouses in Oklahoma
National Register of Historic Places in Love County, Oklahoma
Georgian architecture in Oklahoma
Government buildings completed in 1910